Art competitions were held as part of the 1928 Summer Olympics in Amsterdam, the Netherlands.  Medals were awarded in five categories (architecture, literature, music, painting, and sculpture), for works inspired by sport-related themes.

The art exhibition was held at the Stedelijk Museum from 12 June to 12 August, and displayed 1150 works of art from 18 different countries.  Additionally, the literature competition attracted 40 entries from 10 countries, and the music competition had 22 entries from 9 countries.

The art competitions at the 1928 Games was larger in scope than for previous Games.  Instead of a single competition in each of the five artistic categories, awards were presented in multiple subcategories.  The judges of the music competition declined to award any medals in two of the three subcategories, and only presented a single bronze medal in the third.

Art competitions were part of the Olympic program from 1912 to 1948.
At a meeting of the International Olympic Committee in 1949, it was decided to hold art exhibitions instead, as it was judged illogical to permit professionals to compete in the art competitions but only amateurs were permitted to compete in sporting events.  Since 1952, a non-competitive art and cultural festival has been associated with each Games.

Architecture

Literature

Music

Painting

Sculpture

Medal table
At the time, medals were awarded to these artists, but art competitions are no longer regarded as official Olympic events by the International Olympic Committee.  These events do not appear in the IOC medal database, and these totals are not included in the IOC's medal table for the 1928 Games.

Events summary

Architecture
Designs for Town Planning

The following architects took part:

Architectural Designs

The following architects took part:

Further entries

The following architects took part:

Literature
Dramatic works

The following writers took part:

Epic works

The following writers took part:

Lyric works

The following writers took part:

Music
Compositions for orchestra

The following composers took part:

Compositions for solo or chorus

The following composers took part:

Compositions for instrumental and chamber

The following composers took part:

Painting
Drawings and water colours

The following painters took part:

Graphic arts

The following painters took part:

Paintings

The following painters took part:

Sculpture
Medals and Reliefs

The following sculptors took part:
{| width="100%"
|- valign="top"
|

Statues

The following sculptors took part:

References

External links
 Official catalogue programme, via Olympic World Library

1928 Summer Olympics events
1928
1928 in art
Arts in the Netherlands